Petersburg is an unincorporated community in the town of Haney in Crawford County, Wisconsin, United States. Petersburg is on the Kickapoo River south of Bell Center and is served by Wisconsin Highway 131.

References

Unincorporated communities in Wisconsin
Unincorporated communities in Crawford County, Wisconsin